This is a list of settlements in Northamptonshire ordered by population based on the results of the 2011 census.  In 2011, there were 18 settlements with 5,000 or more inhabitants in Northamptonshire. The next United Kingdom census will take place in 2021.

List of settlements

See also
List of places in Northamptonshire
List of civil parishes in Northamptonshire

References

 
Settlements
Northamptonshire